Tristan or  Tristram or Tristen is a given name descending from Welsh Drystan, influenced by the French word triste and Welsh/Cornish/Breton trist, both of which mean "sad" or "sorrowful".
It owes its popularity to the character of Tristan, one of the Knights of the Round Table and the tragic hero of Tristan and Iseult.

Tristan has been consistently among the top 1000 names given to baby boys in the United States since 1971. There are various alternate forms of the name: Tristen, Triston, Tristin, Tristian, Trystan, and Trysten.

People with the mononym

Tristan
 Tristan l'Hermite, French political and military figure of the late Middle Ages
 Tristan de Clermont, Bartholomew "Tristan" de Clermont-Lodève (1380 – c. 1432), Count of Copertino, was a French-born knight who married Catherine del Balzo Orsini
 Tristan of Montepeloso (born 1020), the first lord of Montepeloso from 1042
 Tristan (musician) (Tristan Cooke, born 1970), British psytrance and Goa trance DJ and producer
 Tristan D (born Tristan Dorian, 1988), British Trance DJ and EDM

Tristán
 Tristán de Luna y Arellano (1510–1573), Spanish explorer and Conquistador

People with the given name

Tristan
 Tristan Bernard, French playwright and novelist
 Tristan Borges, Canadian soccer player
 Tristan Cheung, Hong Kong professional footballer 
 Tristan Davies, British news executive
 Tristan Do, Thai footballer
 Tristan Evans, British drummer
 Tristan A. Farnon, American webcomic author 
 Tristan Gale, American skeleton racer
 Tristan Garel-Jones, British former MP
 Tristan Gemmill, British actor
 Tristan Gommendy, French racing driver
 Tristan Hahót, Hungarian noble
 Tristan Harris, American ethicist
 Tristan Jarry, Canadian ice hockey player
 Tristan Lamasine, French tennis player
 Tristan Louis, French-American internet entrepreneur and writer
 Tristan MacManus, Irish dancer
 Tristan Murail, French composer
 Tristan Nunez, American racing driver
 Tristan Peersman, Belgian footballer
 Tristan Plummer, English footballer
 Tristan Prettyman, American singer-songwriter
 Tristan Risk, Canadian film actress
 Tristan Rogers, Australian-American actor
Tristan Robbins, British cyclist
 Tristan Taormino, American feminist author/activist
 Tristan Thomas, Australian athlete
 Tristan Thompson, Canadian basketball player
 Tristan Tzara, Romanian–French poet and performance artist
 Tristan Vautier, French racing driver
 Tristan Vizcaino (born 1995), American football player
 Tristan Vukčević, Serbian basketball player
 Tristan Wilds, American actor
 Tristan Wirfs (born 1999), American football player
 François Tristan l'Hermite, who wrote as "Tristan"

Tristán
 Tristán Bauer (born 1959), Argentine film maker and screenwriter

Tristen
 Tristen Chernove (born 1975), Canadian Para cyclist and businessman
 Tristen Gaspadarek, American singer-songwriter who performs as "Tristen"
 Tristen Hoge (born 1997), American football player
 Tristen Walker, Australian rules footballer in the Australian Football League

Tristin
 Tristin Mays (born 1990), American actress and singer
 Tristin Norwell, British composer, musician and producer

Triston
 Triston Jay Amero (1982–2008), American terrorist
 Triston Casas (born 2000), American baseball player
 Triston Chambers (born 1982), English footballer
 Triston Cole (born 1976), American politician
 Triston Grant (born 1984), Canadian ice hockey player
 Triston Henry (born 1993), Canadian soccer player
 Triston McKenzie (born 1997), American baseball player
 Triston Mitchell (born 1976), American, certified personal trainer
 Triston Palma (born 1962), Jamaican musician
 Triston Reilly (born 1999), Australian rugby union player
 Triston Wade (born 1993), American football player

Trystan
 Trystan Colon-Castillo (born 1998), American football player
 Trystan Edwards (1884–1973), Welsh architectural critic and town planner
 Trystan Gravelle (born 1981), Welsh actor
 Trystan Owain Hughes (born 1972), British theologian, historian and author
 Trystan Llŷr Griffiths (born c. 1987), Welsh tenor
 Trystan Magnuson (born 1985), Canadian baseball player

Trishton
 Trishton Jackson (born 1998), American football player

Thriston
 Thriston Lawrence (born 1996), South African golfer

People with the surname

Tristan
 Brynjard Tristan (born 1976), Norwegian bassist and songwriter
 Charles Tristan, marquis de Montholon (1783–1853), French general during the Napoleonic Wars
 Flora Tristan (1803–1844), French-Peruvian socialist writer and activist
 Frédérick Tristan (1931–2022), French writer
 Jean Tristan (pirate) (died 1692), French corsair (buccaneer) and pirate
 Jean Tristan, Count of Valois (1250–1270), French prince of the Capetian dynasty
 Julie Tristan, American television personality

Tristán
 Diego Tristán Herrera (born 1976), Spanish footballer
 Louis Tristán (born 1984), Peruvian long jumper
 Luis Tristán de Escamilla, also known as Luis de Escamilla or Luis Rodríguez Tristán (c.1585-1624), Spanish painter in the mannerist style
 Miryam Tristán (born 1985), Peruvian footballer

Fictional characters
 Tristran Thorne, in Neil Gaiman's novel Stardust; name changed to Tristan Thorne in the 2007 film
 Tristan Farnon, in the works of James Herriot
 Tristan Ludlow, the protagonist of Legends of the Fall
 Tristan Taylor, the English name of the character Hiroto Honda in the Yu-Gi-Oh! franchise
 Tristen, a boy in The Fortress Series of fantasy novels by C. J. Cherryh
 Tristan Smith, in Peter Carey's novel The Unusual Life of Tristan Smith.
 Tristan Milligan in Canadian TV series Degrassi
 Tristan McLean, actor and mortal father of the demigod Piper McLean in Rick Riordan's Heroes of Olympus
 Tristan Duffy, in TV series American Horror Story: Hotel
 Tristan Dugrey, in American TV series Gilmore Girls
 Tristan of Avalon Towers, in Soman Chainani's book series The School for Good and Evil
 Tristan Lycanth, played by Liv Rooney in Disney Channel's Liv and Maddie
 Tristan Wren, from the 3D CGI animated television series Star Wars Rebels

See also
 Tristan (disambiguation)
 Tristan da Cunha – a remote volcanic group of islands in the south Atlantic Ocean
 Tristan and Iseult – an influential romance and tragedy story
 Tristram (name)
 The Life and Opinions of Tristram Shandy, Gentleman – a novel by Laurence Sterne

References

Welsh masculine given names
Scottish masculine given names
English masculine given names
Irish masculine given names